Michael Christopher White (born June 28, 1970) is an American writer, actor, producer, and director for television and film, and reality television show contestant. He has won numerous awards, including the Independent Spirit John Cassavetes Award for the 2000 film Chuck & Buck, which he wrote and starred in. He has written the screenplays for films such as School of Rock (2003) and has directed several films that he has written, such as Brad's Status (2017). He was the co-creator, executive producer, writer, director and actor on the HBO series Enlightened. White is also known for his appearances on reality television, competing on two seasons of The Amazing Race and later becoming a contestant and runner-up on Survivor: David vs. Goliath. He created, writes, and directs the ongoing HBO satire comedy anthology series The White Lotus.

Early life
White was born in Pasadena, California. He is the son of Lyla Lee (née Loehr), a fundraising executive, and former executive director of the Pasadena Playhouse, and Reverend Dr. James Melville "Mel" White, a former speechwriter and ghostwriter for Religious Right figures such as Jerry Falwell and Pat Robertson. His father came out as gay in 1994 and became an activist. Due to his father's religious background, White grew up in a modest household in a conservative Christian community. He attended Polytechnic School which he thought was a "very conservative country-club school". Later he went to Wesleyan University, where he met writing partner, Zak Penn. Penn convinced him to move back to Los Angeles, and helped him to get work soon after graduating.

Career
Although White and Penn's writing partnership ended a few years later due to their different sensibilities, they remained on good terms, and White credits him with getting him into Hollywood's social circles. White was a writer and producer on Dawson's Creek and Freaks and Geeks and wrote and acted in the films Chuck & Buck, The Good Girl,  Orange County, School of Rock and Nacho Libre. He also had a role in the 2004 remake of The Stepford Wives, and the 2008 film Smother.  Chuck & Buck, in which White portrayed a manchild who stalks his childhood friend, was named the best film of 2000 by Entertainment Weekly.  In an interview with The New York Times, Jeff Bridges called White's turn in Chuck & Buck "the performance of the decade".

He frequently collaborates with actor–writer Jack Black on films. Together they formed the production company Black and White, which closed in 2006. White is not a fan of classic rock, but he wrote School of Rock specifically so Black could perform his own favorite rock music.

White made his directorial debut with the self-penned Year of the Dog at the 2007 Sundance Film Festival. He was a member of the US Dramatic Jury at the 2009 Sundance Film Festival.

Laura Dern brought White into a project with HBO which became the series Enlightened that premiered on October 10, 2011. Dern's character, Amy Jellicoe, goes to a Hawaiian retreat after her professional life publicly implodes, and is introduced to meditation. White himself had suffered an on-the-job meltdown while running an earlier television series, and incorporated elements of that experience, as well as his own exploration of Buddhist meditation, into the new series' plot. White wrote the pilot and all the episodes in the first and second seasons.

White is a credited writer on The Emoji Movie, he spent three weeks with the film's screenwriters, and helped with the structure of the script. For this project he received a Golden Raspberry Award. He wrote and directed the 2017 film Brad's Status.

In 2021, White created, wrote, and directed The White Lotus, a satirical limited series for HBO.

In February 2022, it was announced White would write two upcoming animated films for Universal Pictures and Illumination: the original comedy Migration, set to be released on June 30, 2023, and the fourth installment in the Despicable Me franchise, set to be released on July 23, 2024.

The Amazing Race
He appeared on the fourteenth season of The Amazing Race along with his father Mel. They lasted for seven legs before being eliminated in sixth place in Phuket, Thailand. Mel and Mike returned to compete in The Amazing Race: Unfinished Business, where they were the second team eliminated in Japan after they both developed hypothermia.

Survivor
White was a contestant on Survivor: David vs. Goliath, as a member of the Goliath tribe, then to reshuffled Jabeni tribe and the merged Kalokalo tribe. He made it to Day 39 and received three jury votes, finishing in second place behind the winner Nick Wilson.

White said he had been a big fan of the show, and because of his connections had developed a friendship with the show's host Jeff Probst, providing the host suggestions towards improving the show. For instance, Probst stated that it was White who discouraged him from bringing back Redemption Island for Survivor: San Juan del Sur. At some point White decided to start trying out to be a participant of the show, but he failed to be picked over what he believed was a concern of having "sloppy seconds" from other reality television programs. White noted that once he was selected, he had had no other conversations with Probst until the game was concluded.

Personal life
White is a vegan and lives in Santa Monica with his boyfriend, Josh. He also owns a house in Kauai. He is openly bisexual.

Filmography

Films

Acting credits

Television

Acting credits

Non-acting credits

Awards and nominations 
 Nominated – Broadcast Film Critics Association Awards (Critics Choice Award) for Best Song: School of Rock
 Deauville Film Festival (Acting Prize): Chuck & Buck
 Independent Spirit Award for Best Feature - Under $500,000: Chuck & Buck
 Independent Spirit Award for Best Screenplay: The Good Girl
 Las Vegas Film Critics Society Awards (Sierra Award) for Best Song: School of Rock
 Nominated – Golden Satellite Award for Best Screenplay, Original: The Good Girl
 Seattle International Film Festival (New American Cinema Award) for Best Writer: Chuck & Buck
 Golden Raspberry Award (Razzie Award for Worst Screenplay): The Emoji Movie
 Primetime Emmy Award for Outstanding Directing for a Limited Series, Movie, or Dramatic Special: The White Lotus
 Primetime Emmy Award for Outstanding Writing for a Limited Series, Movie, or Dramatic Special: The White Lotus
 Primetime Emmy Award for Outstanding Limited Series: The White Lotus

References

External links

 
 
 July 2000 article about White from The Village Voice

1970 births
20th-century American male actors
21st-century American male actors
American bisexual actors
American film producers
American male film actors
American male screenwriters
American male television writers
American soap opera writers
Bisexual male actors
Illumination (company) people
Independent Spirit Award winners
LGBT film directors
LGBT people from California
American LGBT screenwriters
LGBT television directors
Living people
Male actors from Pasadena, California
Primetime Emmy Award winners
Screenwriters from California
Sony Pictures Animation people
Survivor (American TV series) contestants
Television producers from California
The Amazing Race (American TV series) contestants
Wesleyan University alumni
Writers from Pasadena, California
American bisexual writers